Equatorial ridges are a feature of at least three of Saturn's moons: the large moon Iapetus and the tiny moons Atlas and Pan. They are ridges that closely follow the moons' equators. They appear to be unique to the Saturnian system, but it is uncertain whether the occurrences are related or a coincidence. All three were discovered by the Cassini probe in 2005.  Daphnis also appears to have such a ridge.

The ridge on Iapetus is nearly 20 km wide, 13 km high and 1,300 km long. The ridge on Atlas is proportionally even more remarkable given the moon's much smaller size, giving it a disk-like shape. Images of Pan show a structure similar to that of Atlas.

Formation 

It is not certain how these ridges formed, or whether there is any connection between them. Because Atlas and Pan orbit within the rings of Saturn, a likely explanation for their ridges is that they sweep up ring particles as they orbit, which build up around their equators. This theory is less applicable to Iapetus, which orbits far beyond the rings. One scientist has suggested that Iapetus swept up a ring before being somehow expelled to its current, distant orbit. Others think it was stationary and it is the rings that have been pulled away from it, falling into Saturn's gravity field. Perhaps more likely is the theory that because Iapetus has an unusually large Hill sphere compared to other moons in the Solar System, it could once have had its own ring, or even a moonlet that was slowly pulled in closer, torn up into a ring, and then gradually accreted onto Iapetus' equator. But most scientists prefer to assume that Iapetus's ridge was produced by some kind of internal source and is unrelated to the ridges on Atlas and Pan.

Another theory suggested is that low velocity collisions between moons could have formed the bulge at the centre although the circumstances for such an event to happen are slim.

See also
Equatorial troughs of asteroid 4 Vesta

References

External links
'Flying Saucers' Around Saturn Explained - Atlas and Pan born largely from clumps of icy particles in the rings themselves, Space.com, 6 December 2007

Surface features of Saturn's moons